Helen S. Chasin (1938–2015)  was an American poet.

Life

Chasin grew up in Brooklyn, New York.

She attended Radcliffe College and studied with Robert Fitzgerald, Robert Lowell, and John Nims.
She taught at Emerson College, where Thomas Lux was her student.

In 1973, she edited Iowa Review.

Her work appeared in The Missouri Review. New York Quarterly, Paris Review,

She lived in Rockport, Massachusetts.  She died June 10, 2015, in New York City.

Awards
 1968 Yale Series of Younger Poets Competition
 1968 Bread Loaf Fellow 
 1968 to 1970 Bunting Institute fellow

Works
"Joy Sonnet in a Random Universe", Blue Ridge Journal
 
 Coming Close (Yale University Press, 1968)    
"The Word Plum"

Anthologies

References

External links
"WE ARE WHAT WE SAY WE EAT: WHAT'S ON THE MENU IN THE POETRY CLASSROOM?", The CEA Forum, Tom Getz, Winter/Spring 2008: 37.1

1938 births
2015 deaths
Writers from Brooklyn
Radcliffe College alumni
Emerson College faculty
American women poets
American women academics
21st-century American women